Yağız Yılmaz (born 14 October 1993) is a male Turkish recurve archer. He competed in the individual recurve event  and the team recurve event at the 2015 World Archery Championships in Copenhagen, Denmark.

References

Turkish male archers
Living people
Place of birth missing (living people)
1993 births
Archers at the 2010 Summer Youth Olympics
Archers at the 2015 European Games
European Games competitors for Turkey
21st-century Turkish people